Blue Danube may refer to:
"The Blue Danube", a waltz composed by Johann Strauss II
 The Blue Danube (1926 film), a German silent film directed by Frederic Zelnik 
 The Blue Danube (1928 film), an American silent film starring Leatrice Joy
 The Blue Danube (1932 film), a British film
 The Blue Danube (1939 film). an American cartoon film by Hugh Harman
 The Blue Danube (1940 film), an American drama film 
 The Blue Danube (1955 film), an Austrian film 
 Blue Danube (nuclear weapon), the first British operational nuclear weapon
 Blue Danube (band), an Austrian band who represented their country in the 1980 Eurovision Song Contest
 Blue Danube Radio, an English-language radio station in Vienna
 Blue Danube, or Blue Onion, a porcelain pattern
 Blue Danube (album)